Elena Ospitaletche (born 1 August 1960) is a Uruguayan former swimmer. She competed in two events at the 1976 Summer Olympics.

References

External links
 

1960 births
Living people
Uruguayan female swimmers
Olympic swimmers of Uruguay
Swimmers at the 1976 Summer Olympics
Place of birth missing (living people)